Arthur Norman Guthkelch (September 2, 1915 – July 28, 2016) was a British pediatric neurosurgeon. He is sometimes known as the first British pediatric neurosurgeon. He was the first physician to make a connection between shaking an infant and subsequent brain injury.

Biography
Guthkelch was born in Woodford Green. He had wanted to become a veterinarian in early childhood, but he shifted his goal to becoming a physician by the second grade. He went to school at Christ's Hospital school, Horsham, UK. He studied at the University of Oxford, earning a medical degree. He was a registrar at the Manchester Royal Infirmary. Guthkelch worked at the Manchester Royal Infirmary, Salford Royal Hospital, Royal Manchester Children's Hospital and Hull Royal Infirmary. His early career was influenced by the neurosurgeon Sir Geoffrey Jefferson. Guthkelch has been described as the first pediatric neurosurgeon in Great Britain.

Making the connection between subdural hematoma and babies who had sustained shaking injuries, Guthkelch published his conclusions in a 1971 British Medical Journal paper. He said that since there was no stigma associated with shaking infants in Northern England at that time, parents were frank with him that these injured infants had been shaken. Later, he was critical of the broad application of the shaken baby syndrome diagnosis in legal proceedings, saying that illnesses could sometimes cause similar issues to shaken baby syndrome. "In a case of measles, if you get the diagnosis wrong, in seven days' time it really doesn't matter because it's cleared up anyhow," Guthkelch said. "If you get the diagnosis of fatal shaken baby syndrome wrong, potentially someone's life will be terminated." In September 2015, he told Retro Report that he was "shocked" and "desperately disappointed" that prosecutors were using his science as a basis to convict people.

Guthkelch retired from full-time clinical practice 1992 at University Health Sciences Center, Tucson, Arizona, Department of Neurosurgery. In 2009 he began reviewing cases in which people were charged with injuring children by shaking.

The Society for Research into Hydrocephalus and Spina Bifida bestows the Norman Guthkelch Award upon a student or early career scientist involved in spina bifida or hydrocephalus research.

Guthkelch lived in Ohio. He turned 100 in September 2015. On July 28, 2016 Guthkelch died at the age of 100 in Toledo, Ohio.

See also
List of centenarians (medical professionals)

References

1915 births
2016 deaths
American centenarians
British centenarians
Men centenarians
British surgeons
Alumni of the University of Oxford
People educated at Christ's Hospital
British emigrants to the United States
Medical doctors from London